The Soviet of the Nationalities was one of the two chambers of the Supreme Soviet of the Russian SFSR (Russian Federation). In 1990–1993 it consisted of 126 deputies. The Soviet of the Republic was established in 1989, as one of the chambers of the formerly unicameral Supreme Soviet, and elected in 1990.

Soviet of Nationalities was elected by and from among the Congress of People's Deputies of the Russian Federation on the following basis:
 three deputies from each republic
 one deputy from each autonomous oblast
 one deputy from each autonomous district
 63 deputies from krais, oblasts and federal cities of Russia.
On 1 November 1991 the Congress passed the following addition to the Constitution:
If it's impossible to represent republics of the Russian SFSR, autonomous oblast, autonomous districts, krais and oblasts in Soviet of Nationalities of the Supreme Soviet of the Russian SFSR, then deputies from the national districts may propose deputies from territorial districts to be included into Soviet of Nationalities.
This was intended to make chambers equally sized, because there are not enough deputies from national districts.

On 21 September 1993 the Soviet of Nationalities was disbanded by President of Russia, together with the Supreme Soviet and the Congress of People's Deputies. This got actual force after the armed siege of parliament.

Chairman

See also
Soviet of Nationalities of the Supreme Soviet of the Soviet Union

External links
Russian Constitution of 1978 with amendments of 1989-1992

Federalism in Russia
Defunct upper houses
1990 establishments in Russia
1993 disestablishments in Russia
Supreme Soviet of Russia